Corinthians–Itaquera, or just Itaquera, is a station which is part of the metropolitan train system of CPTM and São Paulo Metro.

Corinthians–Itaquera station has this name for being located in the district of Itaquera, in São Paulo, close to Arena Corinthians. There is, also, connection with Poupatempo in Itaquera and Shopping Metrô Itaquera in its surroundings. It's located in Avenida Projetada, 1900.

Metro Line 3–Red
Corinthians–Itaquera station was opened on 1 October 1988, being terminus for São Paulo Metro Line 3–Red, in the East route. In this station, there is also a connection with the Line 3–Red Maintenance Yard, known as "Itaquera yard" or "PIT".

The station is elevated with two island platforms over the distribution level, structure in apparent concrete, and metallic spatial lattice cover. It has adapted access for people with disabilities and reduced movements.

CPTM Line 11–Coral
Corinthians–Itaquera station is a train station on CPTM Line 11–Coral.

The current CPTM station area, which corresponds to one island platform, was built by São Paulo Metro, being unused for almost 12 years, and opened on 27 May 2000 to be used by the then-East Express.

References

São Paulo Metro stations
Companhia Paulista de Trens Metropolitanos stations
Railway stations opened in 1988
Railway stations opened in 2000
2000 establishments in Brazil
1988 establishments in Brazil